Macrocoma debduensis is a species of leaf beetle of Morocco, described by Louis Kocher in 1967. It is possibly a synonym of Macrocoma henoni occidentalis.

References

debduensis
Beetles of North Africa
Beetles described in 1967
Endemic fauna of Morocco